Tacha is a surname. Notable people with the surname include: 

Athena Tacha (born 1936), Greek artist
Deanell Reece Tacha (born 1946), American judge

See also
Zacha